Rodolfo Custódio Testoni (born December 15, 1988, in Itajaí), known as Rodolfo Testoni, is a Brazilian footballer who plays for São Carlos as left back.

Paulistão 2013

Rodolfo became popular when he played for Paulista in 2013. That year he was one of the best left backs in the Paulista A1 State Championship getting famous for his direct free kick shots with power and accuracy. His goal against Santos of Neymar (10/2/2013, Paulista won 1–3, Neymar scored Santos´goal) with a direct free kick shot from long distance was one of the best goals in the competition and had a global repercussion. His reputation as a free kick specialist started to grow when he scored another one against Atlético Sorocaba and he was unlucky in the games against Palmeiras and São Paulo where his direct free kick shots hit the bar in both games. But he proved against these giant clubs that his goals were not a matter of luck.

Série B & C

His good appearances for Paulista opened the door for a transfer to a bigger club, the traditional Guarani which played at Série C and quickly to another traditional club, ABC Natal which played in the Série B of the Brasileirão. Testoni started the league as a starter, but a serious injury ruined his plans. After that he tried his luck in some well known teams of lower leagues in Brazil like Juventus from São Paulo State and ASA from Alagoas.

São Carlos

In 2017 Rodolfo is having one of his best seasons in the Sâo Paulo state A3 Championship playing for Sâo Carlos. In 17 appearances he scored once with a direct free kick, was constant in the defence being one of the best players in the club and the best left back of the competition. He also gave 5 assists and was selected two times in the best XI of the competition. His contract ends in May 2017.

Career statistics

References

External links

1988 births
Living people
Brazilian footballers
Association football defenders
Campeonato Brasileiro Série B players
Campeonato Brasileiro Série C players
Paulista Futebol Clube players
Clube Atlético Juventus players